The P class are a class of diesel locomotives built by A Goninan & Co, Bassendean for Westrail between 1989 and 1991.

History
In 1988, Westrail placed an order for 15 CM25-8 Dash 8 locomotives for bulk grain and general freight haulage with A Goninan & Co. A 16th was later ordered followed by a 17th funded by AMC Mineral Sands.

In 1997, the class was fitted with Locotrol equipment to allow them to operate in top and tail formation.

All were included in the sale of Westrail to Australian Railroad Group in December 2000, with the class redesignated as the 2500 class. In June 2006, all were included in the sale of Australian Railroad Group's Western Australian operation to QR National. All 17 remain in service with Aurizon as at October 2014.

Status list

References

External links

Flickr gallery

Aurizon diesel locomotives
Co-Co locomotives
Diesel locomotives of Western Australia
Railway locomotives introduced in 1989
Diesel-electric locomotives of Australia
3 ft 6 in gauge locomotives of Australia